Cristian Michael Coimbra Arias (born December 31, 1988) is a Bolivian football central defender who plays for club Real Santa Cruz in the Bolivian Primera División.

Club career
Coimbra began his football career in 2007 with Guabirá. In 2012, he joined Sport Boys Warnes and helped the club gain promotion to first division the following year. His good form rewarded him with a transfer to Blooming in July 2014.

International career
Coimbra was summoned to the Bolivia national team for  the 2015 Copa America. He made his debut on June 15 at Valparaíso's Estadio Elías Figueroa in a 3-2 victory over Ecuador, coming off the bench in the 56th minute replacing Ricardo Pedriel.

References

External links

Soccerpunter profile

1988 births
Living people
Sportspeople from Santa Cruz de la Sierra
Association football central defenders
Bolivian footballers
Bolivia international footballers
Guabirá players
Sport Boys Warnes players
Club Blooming players
Real Santa Cruz players
Bolivian Primera División players
2015 Copa América players